The 2018 Copa do Brasil (officially the Copa Continental Pneus do Brasil 2018 for sponsorship reasons) was the 30th edition of the Copa do Brasil football competition. It was held between 30 January and 17 October 2018. The competition was contested by 91 teams, which qualified either by participating in their respective state championships (70), by the 2018 CBF ranking (10), by the 2017 Copa do Nordeste (1), by the 2017 Copa Verde (1), by the 2017 Série B (1) or by qualifying for the 2018 Copa Libertadores (8).

Cruzeiro were the defending champions. They successfully defended their title, winning the finals 3–1 on aggregate against Corinthians for their 6th title. As champions, Cruzeiro qualified for the 2019 Copa Libertadores Group stage and the 2019 Copa do Brasil Round of 16.

Jádson (Corinthians) and Cássio (Corinthians) won best player and best goalkeeper awards, respectively.

Format
The competition was a single elimination knockout tournament, the first two stages featuring a single match and the other stages featuring two-legged ties. Eleven teams qualified for the Round of 16 (the that teams qualified for the 2018 Copa Libertadores (8), Série B champions, Copa Verde champions and Copa do Nordeste champions). The remaining 80 teams played the first stage. The 40 winners played the second stage, the 20 winners played the third stage, the 10 winners played the fourth stage. The five fourth-stage winners qualified for the Round of 16.

In this season, the away goals rule was not be used in any stage.

Qualified teams
Teams in bold are qualified directly for the round of 16.

Schedule
The schedule of the competition is as follows.

Draw

First stage

Second stage

Third stage

Fourth stage

Final stages

Bracket

Round of 16

Quarter-finals

Semi-finals

Finals

Top goalscorers

References

 
2018
2018 in Brazilian football
2018 domestic association football cups